Nové Sady is a municipality and village in Vyškov District in the South Moravian Region of the Czech Republic. It has about 100 inhabitants.

Administrative parts
The village of Březina is an administrative part of Nové Sady.

References

Villages in Vyškov District